This is a list of members of the South Australian Legislative Council from 1915 to 1918.

 Liberal MLC Arthur Richman Addison died on 29 July 1915. William Morrow was elected unopposed to the vacancy on 16 August.
 Liberal MLC Sir John Downer died on 2 August 1915. Joseph Botterill was elected unopposed to the vacancy on 16 August.
 Labor MLC Ern Klauer died on 6 August 1915. William Humphrey Harvey was elected unopposed to the vacancy on 20 August.
 James Phillips Wilson was expelled from the Labor Party in September 1915 over a dispute about his committee memberships. He sat thereafter as an independent, but would later join the National Party after the 1917 Labor split.
 In the February 1917 Labor split, the official Labor Party expelled Premier Crawford Vaughan and his supporters, including three of their MLCs, William Humphrey Harvey, Alfred William Styles and John Vaughan, over their support for conscription in World War I. The expelled MPs formed the National Labor Party in March, and were joined by ex-Labor independent Wilson; the party was renamed the National Party in June.
 The United Labor Party changed their name to the Labor Party in 1917.
 Liberal MLC Edward Lucas resigned on 1 February 1918 upon his appointment as Agent-General for South Australia. A by-election was not held due to the proximity of the 1918 election, at which Lucas' seat, expiring in 1921, was filled concurrently with the other class of seats.

References
Parliament of South Australia — Statistical Record of the Legislature

Members of South Australian parliaments by term
20th-century Australian politicians